The following is a list of stations that are currently affiliated with the American Spanish-language network, V-me, until now, arranged by state. The network switched to a cable and satellite model of distribution after the latter date.

 Tucson, Arizona - KUAT-TV - 6.2
 Fresno, California - KVPT - 18.3
 Los Angeles, California - KCET - 28.3
 Sacramento, California - KVIE - 6.3
 San Diego, California - KPBS-TV - 15.2
 San Jose, California - KQEH - 54.5
 Watsonville, California - KQET - 25.3
 Boulder, Colorado - K24HQ-D - 24.4
 Denver, Colorado - KRMA - 6.2
 Durango, Colorado - KRMU - 20.2
 Grand Junction, Colorado - KRMJ - 18.2
 Pueblo, Colorado - KTSC-TV - 8.2
 Steamboat Springs, Colorado - KRMZ - 24.2
 Miami, Florida - WPBT - 2.3
 Orlando, Florida - WUCF-TV - 24.4
 Pensacola, Florida - WSRE - 23.4
 Tampa, Florida - WEDU - 3.2
 West Palm Beach, Florida - WXEL-TV - 42.3
 Chicago, Illinois - WTTW - 11.4
 Bloomington, Indiana - WTIU - 30.4
 Indianapolis, Indiana -  WFYI - 20.2 
 New Orleans, Louisiana - WLAE-TV - 32.4
 Annapolis, Maryland - WMPT - 22.3
 Baltimore, Maryland - WMPB - 67.3 
 Frederick, Maryland - WFPT - 62.3
 Hagerstown, Maryland - WWPB - 31.3
 Oakland, Maryland - WGPT - 36.3 
 Salisbury, Maryland - WCPB - 28.3
 Newark, New Jersey - WNET - 13.3
 Albuquerque, New Mexico - KNME-TV - 5.2
 Las Cruces, New Mexico - KRWG-TV - 22.3
 Las Vegas, Nevada - KLVX - 10.3
 Reno, Nevada - KNPB - 5.3
 Akron, Ohio - WEAO-TV - 49.4
 Alliance, Ohio - WNEO - 45.4
 Allentown, Pennsylvania - WLVT-TV - 39.3
 Mayagüez, Puerto Rico - WIPM-TV - 3.4
 San Juan, Puerto Rico - WIPR-TV - 6.4
 Providence, Rhode Island - WSBE-TV - 36.3
 Amarillo, Texas - KACV-TV - 2.2
 Austin, Texas - KLRU - 18.4
 Harlingen, Texas - KMBH - 38.2
 Houston, Texas - KUHT - 8.3
 El Paso, Texas - KRWG-TV - 22.3
 San Antonio, Texas - KLRN - 9.3
 Salt Lake City, Utah - KUED - 7.3
 St. George, Utah - KUEW - 18.3
 Front Royal, Virginia - WVPY - 42.3
 Staunton, Virginia - WVPT - 51.3
 Seattle, Washington - KCTS-TV - 9.2
 Yakima, Washington - KYVE - 47.2
 Milwaukee, Wisconsin - WMVS - 10.3

References

External links

 

Spanish-language television networks in the United States
Corporation for Public Broadcasting
Public television in the United States